The Journal of Imperial and Commonwealth History is a peer-reviewed academic journal covering the history of the British Empire and Commonwealth and comparative European colonial experiences. It was established in 1972 and is issued five times per year by Routledge. The editors-in-chief are Stephen Howe (University of Bristol) and Philip Murphy (Institute of Commonwealth Studies, University of London).

Abstracting and indexing 
The journal is abstracted and indexed in:

References

External links 
 

English-language journals
History journals
Publications established in 1972
Taylor & Francis academic journals